Feyzabad-e Lalaha (also Romanized as Feyẕābād-e Lālahā; also known as Rūstāi Feyẕābād-e Laleh Hā) is a village in Fazl Rural District, in the Central District of Nishapur County, Razavi Khorasan Province, Iran. At the 2006 census, its population was 51, in 13 families.

References 

Populated places in Nishapur County